Georgi Velinov Velinov (born 5 October 1957 in Ruse), nicknamed Johnny, is a former Bulgarian footballer and football manager. A goalkeeper, he was elected Bulgarian Footballer of the Year in 1981.

Career
Velinov played for PFC Dunav Rousse (1974–1975, four A PFG matches) and PFC Cherno More Varna (1976–1978, 37 A PFG matches) before joining PFC CSKA Sofia, of whom he was part of from 1978 to 1987. During his first stay with CSKA, Velinov won the A PFG in 1980, 1981, 1982, 1983 and 1987 and the Bulgarian Cup in 1981, 1983, 1985 and 1987. Velinov then moved to Portugal to play for S.C. Braga (1987–1988), Atlético Clube de Portugal (1988–1989) and Elvas (1989–1990). He returned to Bulgaria and played one more season with CSKA, 1991–1992, winning the A PFG once more and setting his number of league appearances for CSKA at 285.

Velinov continued his career in PFC Slavia Sofia (1993–1994, 12 A PFG matches), PFC Sliven (1994) and Botev Novi Pazar (1995). His career spanned 338 A PFG matches, 33 senior Bulgaria national football team appearances, 21 under-21 features and 17 junior international games. He was an awarded a Master of Sports honour in 1980 and won the Bulgarian Footballer of the Year prize in 1981.

In 1995–1996, Velinov was the manager of FC Lokomotiv Rousse; it was under his management that Lokomotiv first managed to defeat their local rivals Dunav, beating them 1–0. The defeat meant Dunav would be relegated to the amateur V AFG for the first time ever while Lokomotiv would remain in the B PFG. He has also worked as a goalkeeper coach and as a coach in CSKA's youth teams. In May 2007, he became a liver transplant recipient.

References

External links
 
 

1957 births
Living people
Bulgarian footballers
Bulgaria international footballers
First Professional Football League (Bulgaria) players
FC Dunav Ruse players
PFC Cherno More Varna players
PFC CSKA Sofia players
S.C. Braga players
Atlético Clube de Portugal players
PFC Slavia Sofia players
Expatriate footballers in Portugal
Bulgarian expatriates in Portugal
Association football goalkeepers
Bulgarian football managers
Liver transplant recipients
Sportspeople from Ruse, Bulgaria